Melody World is a televised singing competition broadcast in Myanmar by Myawaddy TV. Several prominent Burmese singers, including Chan Chan, Irene Zin Mar Myint, and Ni Ni Khin Zaw, made their musical debuts on Melody World.

The show is hosted by Myint Moe Aung. Judges for the show have included Burmese composers KAT (Kyaw Kyaw Aung) and Maung Thit Min.

Cast

Htet Nay Chi (singer)
Chan Chan
Ni Ni Khin Zaw
Ko Ko Mg
Khin Su Su Naing
Kyaw Thiha
Irene Zin Mar Myint
Kyaw Zin Min
Phyo Pyae Sone
Shwe Yi Phyo Maung
Jewel (ဂျူဝယ်)
Khaing Shwe War
Wai Wai Hlaing Oo

Phyoe Pyae Sone

References

External links

Burmese television series
Singing competitions
Myawaddy TV original programming